Skrew is an American industrial metal band. Formed in 1990 and disbanded in 1998, the group announced its return in 2009.

Biography 
Skrew was formed in 1990 in Austin, Texas, by Adam Grossman and Danny Lohner.  The band emerged from the demise of crossover thrash band Angkor Wat, of which Grossman and Lohner were members. Skrew recruited Al Jourgensen of Ministry, to record and produce its 1991 debut album Burning in Water, Drowning in Flame. The album fared well commercially (out-selling every debut on the Metal Blade catalog) and received high praise from critics. It was during this period that Lohner left the band initially auditioning for the Red Hot Chili Peppers before being hired by Nine Inch Nails.

Skrew proceeded to work on its second release, Dusted, which was released in 1994. This album saw the addition of keyboardist Jim Vollentine, who would remain with the band until 1998. Like its predecessor, Dusted was highly praised by critics and fans, and is still considered a classic in field of industrial metal by many fans of the genre. Commercially, however, it was less successful than Burning.
 
The band's music then underwent significant change, probably due to a head-on automobile collision that Grossman experienced in 1995, the result of which was the 1996 album Shadow of Doubt. The album largely moved away from the band's previous sound, featuring more of a slow, extreme thrash metal sound somewhat similar to other 1990s metal bands such as Machine Head. The band went through several member changes in the next year, but by 1997, Grossman had a stable line-up and released the band's final album, Angel Seed XXIII, which featured a style somewhat reminiscent of the then-emerging nu metal genre. The album received even less attention than its predecessor due to a lack of support from their label. Skrew went on hiatus in 1998.

In late 2009, Grossman began putting the pieces of Skrew back together again. The reformed band debuted on February 12, 2011, in Austin, Texas with a follow-up appearance in March 2011 at the SXSW music festival. The new material was much more politically oriented in terms of lyrics and musically might be more comparable to the Scandinavian extreme metal scene, all the while maintaining the roots of their distinctive sound.

In July 2014, Skrew digitally released Universal Immolation, their first album in 17 years. Worldwide touring commenced in 2015.

Members

Current 
Adam Grossman – vocals, guitars, programming (1990–1998, 2009–present)
Ricktor Ravensbrück – guitars (2014–present)
Laurent Le Baut – drums (1990–1998, 2009–present)

Former 
Danny Lohner – guitars, vocals (1990–1991)
Rick Weir – keyboards, programming (1990–1991)
Tony Maingot – keyboards, programming (1990–1991)
Dusty Kohn – guitar
Myke Bingham – bass
Mike Robinson – guitars
Clay Campbell – guitars
Bobby Gustafson – guitars (1996)
Mike Peoples – bass
Brandon Workman – bass
Robb Lampmann – guitars
Chris Ault – keyboards, programming
Mark Dufour – drums
Chadwick Davis – bass
Eddie Travis – drums
Steve "Snake" Green – guitars
Marc "Frap" Frappier – bass
Jim Vollentine – keyboards, programming (1994–1998)
Barry Adelman – drums
Chris Istas – drums
Kyle Sanders – bass
Paul Gooch – programming
Jason Lindgren – guitars
William Ables – guitars
Doug (Snide) Chapius – guitars

Discography 
Studio albums
Burning in Water, Drowning in Flame (1992, Metal Blade)
Dusted (1994, Metal Blade)
Shadow of Doubt (1996, Metal Blade)
Angel Seed XXIII (1997, Metal Blade)
Universal Immolation (2014, Awesome Kickass Records)

References

External links 

American industrial music groups
American death metal musical groups
Extreme metal musical groups
Heavy metal musical groups from Texas
American industrial metal musical groups
Musical groups disestablished in 1998
Musical groups established in 1990
Musical groups from Austin, Texas
Musical groups reestablished in 2009
Metal Blade Records artists